Ward is Administrative Unit in Khyber Pakhtunkhwa (KPK). It is notified in Khyber Pakhtunkhwa Local Government Act 2013.

Ward is same like Union Council, But Ward is new term and new demarcation by Khyber Pakhtunkhwa Government.
While Union Councils are based upon West Pakistan Land Revenue Act, 1967 (W.P. Act No. XVII of 1967)

Ward may consist of:
 Village Council or  
 Neighbourhood Council

Village Council is rural places, while Neighbourhood Councils  are urban and they are near to main city or have some of characteristics of city.

Each ward is considered to be a complete local government, having their own District Councilor, Tehsil Councilor, General Councilors, Peasant Councilors, Women Councilors and Youth Councilors, to represent different communities of human and to struggle for their own benefits.

In Khyber Pakhtunkhwa there are total 2996 Village Councils.
and 505 Neighborhood Councils. While total amount of Union Councils is 1001.

See also 
 Village Council (KPK)
 Neighbourhood Council 
 KPK Local Government Act 2013 (Village Council)
 Babuzai

References

External links
 Neighbourhood Council
 Local Bodies Government

Geography of Khyber Pakhtunkhwa